Lyambir may refer to:
Lyambir (air base), an air base in Russia
Lyambir (rural locality), a rural locality (a selo) in the Republic of Mordovia, Russia